Alcobertas is a civil parish in the municipality of Rio Maior, Portugal. The population in 2011 was 1,923, in an area of 32.03 km².

References

Freguesias of Rio Maior